Maoye International Holdings Limited, or Maoye International, Maoye, is the top-rank leading department store in Shenzhen, Guangdong, China and is engaged in department store and retailing business in Guangdong, Sichuan, Chongqing and Jiangsu.

Maoye postponed in the Hong Kong Stock Exchange for two times in 2000 and January 2008 respectively due to poor stock market conditions at that time, until it was successfully listed on 5 May 2008. At the first trading day, its stock price closed at HK$3.04, 2% lower compared with its IPO price, HK$3.1.

References

Companies listed on the Hong Kong Stock Exchange
Retail companies established in 1996
Department stores of China
Companies based in Shenzhen
Privately held companies of China